Panas Petrovych Lyubchenko (14 January 1897 – 30 August 1937) was a Ukrainian and Soviet politician, who served as the Chairman of the Council of People's Commissars of Ukrainian SSR (today's equivalent of prime-minister) from 1934 to 1937.

Panas Lyubchenko was a member of the Ukrainian Central Council and the Central Committee elected by the 17th Congress of the All-Union Communist Party (Bolsheviks). He attended the Plenum of 23 February 1937.

In 1937, Lyubchenko shot his wife Maria Nikolaevna Krupenyk and then committed suicide after he was accused of treason by colluding with Ukrainian
separatists who wished to detach Ukraine from the Soviet Union. Lyubchenko denied the allegations.

References

1897 births
1937 deaths
People from Kaharlyk
People from Kiev Governorate
Ukrainian people in the Russian Empire
Politburo of the Central Committee of the Communist Party of Ukraine (Soviet Union) members
Soviet politicians who committed suicide
Chairpersons of the Council of Ministers of Ukraine
Ukrainian emigrants to Russia